Bak Sin-hee (Hangul: 박신희) is a South Korean voice actress who began her career as a voice actress by joining Daekyo Broadcasting Corporation at a workout at the end of 2000.

She joined the Munhwa Broadcasting Corporation's voice acting division in 2002 and achieved stardom as a freelancer in MBC's Magical DoReMi as "Na Mo Mo". She joined the Korea Voice Performance Association in 2005. Currently, Bak is cast in the Season 2 Korea TV Edition of 24 as Megan Matheson, replacing Skye McCole Bartusiak. She is also the voice of the navigation product Navi by Hyundai Autonet.

Roles

Broadcast TV
24 (replacing Skye McCole Bartusiak, Korea TV Edition, MBC)
Ojamajo Doremi (Magical Remi) from 2nd Series and 3rd Series, Korea TV Edition, MBC)
CSI: Crime Scene Investigation (extra guest, Korea TV Edition, MBC)
CSI: Miami (extra guest, Korea TV Edition, MBC)
Stupid Puccini (Korea TV Edition, MBC)
Flower outline Men (Korea TV Edition, MBC)
Stuart Little (Korea TV Edition, MBC)
Smallville (TV series) (extra guest, Korea TV Edition, MBC)
Frog Magical (Daekyo Broadcasting Corporation)
Little Truck Trio (Daekyo Broadcasting Corporation)
Adventure King (Daekyo Broadcasting Corporation)
Hit 50 Years (Radio Drama, MBC)

Movie dubbing
What Women Want (extra guest, Korea TV Edition, MBC)
The Addams Family (extra guest, Korea TV Edition, MBC)
Unagi (movie) (extra guest, Korea TV Edition, MBC)
Ring (film) (extra guest, Korea TV Edition, MBC)
Vanilla Sky (extra Guest, Korea TV Edition, MBC)

Game
MapleStory - Mercedes (female), Kaiser (female), Evan (female), Lilin, Lania (Heroes of Maple),
Genshin Impact - Yoimiya (female)
Cookie Run: Kingdom - Cocoa Cookie (female)

Community involvement
Country Report (KTV)
Valance Generate (KTV)
Change Korea (KTV)
Samsung Companion Broadcaster

Other voice
Yoon's English
Tuntun English
Bean and Ground (Baby Edu instrument)
Hyundai Autonet Navigation
Frog Magical (Daekyo Broadcasting Corporation, Song record, Opening and Ending)
Akubi (anime) (Daekyo Broadcasting Corporation, Song record, Opening and Ending)
Magical DoReMi (Korea TV Edition in Song record, Ending, MBC)

See also
Munhwa Broadcasting Corporation
MBC Voice Acting Division

External links
Daum Cafe Voice Actor Bak Sin Hee Fan Cafe (in Korean)
MBC Voice Acting division Bak Sin Hee Blog (in Korean)
Ad Sound Bak Sin Hee Blog (in Korean)
Hyundai Autonet (in English)

Living people
South Korean voice actresses
Year of birth missing (living people)
21st-century South Korean actresses
Place of birth missing (living people)